Thomas Westerman Wolf (born November 17, 1948) is an American politician and businessman who served as the 47th governor of Pennsylvania from 2015 to 2023. A member of the Democratic Party, he defeated Republican incumbent Tom Corbett in the 2014 gubernatorial election and was reelected in 2018 by a margin of 17.1%. Before his election as governor, Wolf was the secretary of the Pennsylvania Department of Revenue from April 2007 to November 2008 and Chairman and CEO of his business.

Early life and education
Wolf was born and raised in Mount Wolf, Pennsylvania, the son of Cornelia Rohlman (née Westerman) (1923–2018) and William Trout Wolf (1921–2016), a business executive. His hometown was named after his ancestor, who was the town's postmaster.

He was raised Methodist. 

Wolf attended his local public school through 10th grade and graduated from The Hill School, in Pottstown, Pennsylvania, in 1967. He went on to receive a B.A. in government, magna cum laude, from Dartmouth College in 1972, an M.Phil. from the University of London in 1978, and a Ph.D. in political science from the Massachusetts Institute of Technology in 1981. While a student at Dartmouth, Wolf took a leave of absence and joined the Peace Corps, with which he spent over two years in India. 

After earning his Ph.D., his dissertation on the United States House of Representatives was named the best of 1981 by the American Political Science Association. Wolf turned down an opportunity to interview for a tenure-track faculty position at Harvard University to begin his career at The Wolf Organization as manager of a True Value store owned by the company.

He met his wife, Frances, in London, when they were both students. They married in 1975 and have two adult daughters.

Business and early political career
Wolf purchased The Wolf Organization in 1985 with two partners. During the administration of Governor Robert P. Casey, Wolf served on an economic development board and on the Pennsylvania Legislative Commission on Urban Schools.

After selling his company to a private equity firm in 2006, Wolf was nominated by then-governor Ed Rendell in January 2007 to be the secretary of revenue of Pennsylvania. He served in that position in Rendell's cabinet from his April 2007 confirmation by the Pennsylvania State Senate until he resigned in November 2008. He had planned to run for governor of Pennsylvania in the 2010 election, but ultimately did not in order to repurchase the Wolf Organization, which was facing bankruptcy. Wolf continued to serve as an executive in The Wolf Organization until his election as governor. He served as chairman and chief executive officer until stepping down from the latter position in December 2013 to focus on his gubernatorial campaign and from the board altogether in December 2014 after his election.

Wolf chaired the York County United Way, the York County Community Foundation, the York College board of trustees, and  the York County Chamber of Commerce, WITF, the regional public television system, Better York, Historic York, the Housing Council of York, and the Administrative Board of Otterbein United Methodist Church. He has also served on the boards of the York Jewish Community Center, Memorial Hospital of York and Crispus Attucks of York.

Governor of Pennsylvania

2014 election

On April 2, 2013, Wolf announced his candidacy for governor of Pennsylvania in the 2014 election. He pledged $10 million of his own money toward the primary election, with an intent to raise at least $5 million from supporters. He was the third person to announce candidacy, after John Hanger of the Pennsylvania Department of Environmental Protection and Max Meyers, a minister from Cumberland County, but at least four others were expected to join the race.

By March 2014, several polls suggested Wolf was the front-runner in the race for the Democratic nomination after an extensive television campaign. A February 2014 Franklin & Marshall College poll showed him with a 27-point lead over his nearest competitor, Allyson Schwartz, and a Harper poll showed him leading Schwartz by 26 points, as did a late March 2014 Franklin & Marshall poll.

In late April and early May, Wolf faced attacks from fellow candidate Rob McCord over his association with controversial former York, Pennsylvania, mayor Charlie Robertson. Schwartz accused Wolf's campaign of plagiarizing his "Fresh Start" plan from an energy equipment company. Despite the attacks, a Muhlenberg College/Morning Call poll suggested Wolf continued to lead with 38% to Schwartz's 13% and McCord's 11%.

In the May 20 primary, Wolf defeated Schwartz, McCord, and Katie McGinty to win the Democratic nomination. He faced incumbent Republican Governor Tom Corbett in the November general election. Heading into the final two months of the campaign, a number of polls indicated a varying but consistent advantage for Wolf over Corbett. Although Corbett slightly narrowed the deficit as the election approached, Wolf maintained a lead in the race. On November 4, Wolf was elected governor with 54.9% of the vote. His victory was notable for engaging traditionally Republican areas of the state. Insiders have attributed this phenomenon to Regional Field Director Brendan Murray and his extensive relationship network in north-central Pennsylvania. Wolf is the first challenger to oust a sitting governor of Pennsylvania since the state's governors became eligible for immediate reelection in 1968.

First term

Wolf took office as Pennsylvania's 47th governor upon the expiration of Corbett's term on January 20, 2015, with the inaugural ceremony occurring in front of the Pennsylvania State Capitol in Harrisburg. Upon taking office, he opted not to move into the Pennsylvania Governor's Residence but instead commute from his home in York. A spokesman for Wolf said the residence would still be used for official events and other functions. Shortly after being sworn in, Wolf signed two executive orders banning gifts to state employees and requiring a bidding process for outside legal contracts. Wolf also restored a ban on hydraulic fracturing, or "fracking", in state parks and placed a moratorium on the death penalty in Pennsylvania. The most significant executive action in his first days in office was his move to fully expand Medicaid under the Affordable Care Act.

Wolf proposed his first budget in March 2015, which included an increase in education spending, reductions in property taxes and the corporate tax, and a new severance tax on natural gas. Six months into his tenure, in July 2015, the websites OnTheIssues and InsideGov named Wolf the most liberal incumbent governor in the nation, based on a rating of public statements and press releases among other measures; Wolf rejected this assessment, arguing that his policies were directed by practicality rather than ideology.

On July 1, 2015, Wolf vetoed a budget the Pennsylvania General Assembly submitted to him, causing a budget dispute between the governor's office and the legislature. This marked the first time a Pennsylvania governor vetoed a budget bill in its entirety since Milton Shapp did so in 1976. Wolf argued the budget was not balanced, disputing Republicans' claim that it would provide increased funding in certain areas without raising taxes. A point of dispute in the budget process was the proposed privatization of Pennsylvania's wine and liquor sales, which Wolf opposed. The state operated without a full budget for 267 days—the longest period without a full budget in Pennsylvania history—until the 2015–16 budget became law without Wolf's signature in March 2016.

In January 2016, at Elizabethtown College, Wolf announced the launch of the "It's On Us PA" campaign, which aims to expand awareness of sexual assault in schools and on college campuses. Pennsylvania was the first state to implement a statewide campaign that called for a collaboration of schools, law enforcement, victim services organizations, and other community members to promote awareness, education, and bystander intervention of sexual violence specifically on school campuses. Several schools, including Franklin and Marshall College and Butler County Community College, and Pennsylvania State System of Higher Education Chancellor Frank Brogan signed on to the initiative. On November 30, 2016, Wolf announced the awarding of "It's On Us PA" grants of $1 million to 36 post-secondary schools in the state to combat sexual violence on their campuses. Programs considered for funding included but were not limited to those that enhanced awareness of available resources as well as the rights of students and, most importantly, to increase mechanisms for anonymous reporting.

Wolf has expressed his opposition to targeting countries with economic sanctions or boycotts, saying, "We ... will not encourage economic punishment in place of peaceful solutions to challenging conflicts" (he later singled out Russia as an exception to this policy and immediately declared his support for sanctions and divestment from Russia after the 2022 invasion of Ukraine during his second term).

Wolf signed into law bills that legalized medical marijuana in Pennsylvania, reformed pensions, and expanded the number of offenses former criminal defendants could get sealed, among other legislation.

On February 24, 2016, Wolf announced that he had been diagnosed with prostate cancer. Because it was diagnosed early, he said it would not hinder his ability to work. After treatment, Wolf's spokesperson announced in January 2017 that Wolf's physician had given him a "clean bill of health".

Wolf declared Pennsylvania's heroin and opioid addiction crisis a statewide emergency in January 2018. Pennsylvania became the eighth state to do so. Such a declaration lets Pennsylvania officials "override any current rules or regulations they perceive as hampering the state's ability to address the opioid epidemic".

2018 election

Wolf ran for reelection in 2018 and was unopposed in the Democratic primary. He defeated Republican State Senator Scott Wagner in the November 8 general election with about 57% of the vote. He is the first Pennsylvania governor to win election twice while losing both times in his home county (since 1968, when a new state constitution permitted governors to run for consecutive terms).

Second term

In 2019, Wolf signed reforms into law that would allow no-excuse mail-in ballot voting.
	 
On June 23, 2020, State Representative Daryl Metcalfe and 24 co-sponsors introduced five articles of impeachment in House Resolution 915 against Wolf based on charges that he damaged Pennsylvania's economy and exceeded his authority by unilaterally and unlawfully imposing his mitigation orders amid the COVID-19 pandemic. The bill was referred to the House Judiciary Committee but moved no further. On September 14, 2020, District Court Judge William S. Stickman IV ruled that the restrictions Wolf imposed during the pandemic were unconstitutional, violating the right to freedom of assembly guaranteed by the First Amendment. State officials asked Stickman to delay his ruling by while they appealed, but he declined. The United States Court of Appeals for the Third Circuit later stayed the decision, allowing the restrictions to resume.

In September and October 2020, Wolf held a series of press conferences making the case for legalizing recreational cannabis in Pennsylvania, arguing that the reform was particularly needed in light of the economic downturn caused by COVID-19 and the prospect of losing revenue to New Jersey, which had recently legalized cannabis. Wolf first came out for legalization in 2019 after a statewide listening tour by Lieutenant Governor John Fetterman showed broad support for legalization.

Republican lawmakers brought two questions limiting Wolf's gubernatorial powers to a statewide vote on May 18, 2021, limiting disaster declarations from 90 to 21 days, transferring power to extend emergency orders from the governor to the state legislature and permitting a simple majority of the legislature to terminate such a declaration at any time. Both passed, with publications declaring the measures victorious with 52% of the vote on May 19, making Pennsylvania the first state to approve a curb on a governor's emergency powers since the start of the COVID-19 pandemic. Nevertheless, Wolf went on to sign 66 new laws sent to him by the legislature on November 3, 2022, addressing a range of issues including clean energy tax credits, cracking down on turnpike toll scofflaws, and new initiatives designed to curb the opioid epidemic.

Electoral history

References

External links

Governor Tom Wolf official government website (archived)
Tom Wolf for Governor campaign website

|-

|-

|-

|-

1948 births
20th-century American businesspeople
21st-century American businesspeople
21st-century American politicians
Alumni of the University of London
American Episcopalians
Businesspeople from Pennsylvania
Dartmouth College alumni
Democratic Party governors of Pennsylvania
Former Methodists
Living people
MIT School of Humanities, Arts, and Social Sciences alumni
Peace Corps volunteers
State cabinet secretaries of Pennsylvania
The Hill School alumni
Politicians from York County, Pennsylvania